New Site is a town in Tallapoosa County, Alabama, United States. It incorporated in 1965. At the 2010 census the population was 773, down from 848 in 2000. It is part of the Alexander City Micropolitan Statistical Area.

Geography
New Site is located at  (33.030281, -85.786721).

Demographics

As of the census of 2000, there were 848 people, 339 households, and 240 families residing in the town. The racial makeup of the town was 89.27% White, 9.79% Black or African American, 0.59% Native American, 0.24% from other races, and 0.12% from two or more races. 0.47% of the population were Hispanic or Latino of any race.

There were 339 households, out of which 30.7% had children under the age of 18 living with them, 52.8% were married couples living together, 14.7% had a female householder with no husband present, and 29.2% were non-families. 26.0% of all households were made up of individuals, and 15.6% had someone living alone who was 65 years of age or older. The average household size was 2.50 and the average family size was 3.00.

In the town, the population was spread out, with 22.5% under the age of 18, 8.4% from 18 to 24, 30.2% from 25 to 44, 23.3% from 45 to 64, and 15.6% who were 65 years of age or older. The median age was 39 years. For every 100 females, there were 90.1 males. For every 100 females age 18 and over, there were 86.1 males.

The median income for a household in the town was $29,167, and the median income for a family was $37,396. Males had a median income of $25,977 versus $20,109 for females. The per capita income for the town was $14,113. About 13.3% of families and 17.6% of the population were below the poverty line, including 23.7% of those under age 18 and 15.9% of those age 65 or over.

Notable person
 Albert Patterson, attorney who practiced in and was assassinated in Phenix City, Alabama

References

Towns in Tallapoosa County, Alabama
Towns in Alabama
Alexander City micropolitan area